This is a list of football transfers involving teams from the Argentine Primera División for the 2008–09 season.

July–August (winter) transfer window

Argentinos Juniors 
In
 Matías Córdoba from  Real Salt Lake (loan return)
 Mauro Bogado from  Instituto (loan return)
 Mariano Martínez from  Olimpo
 Rodrigo Díaz &  Juan Ramón Fernández from  Colón
 Nicolás Pavlovich from  Banfield (loan)
 Carlos Recalde from  San Martín de San Juan
 Franco Quiroga from  Nueva Chicago
Out
 Pablo Barzola to  Caen
 Roberto Battión &  Alejandro Delorte to  Aris F.C.
 Álvaro Pereira to  CFR Cluj
 Nicolás Gianni (loan) &  Milovan Mirosevic to  Universidad Católica
 Lionel Coudannes (loan) &  Ariel Seltzer to  Independiente Rivadavia
 Bruno Urribarri to  Asteras Tripolis
 Sebastián Brunet (released)

Arsenal de Sarandí 
In
 Facundo Coria &  Sergio Sena from  Vélez Sársfield (loan)
 Daniel Carou from  Cipolletti
 Facundo Sava from  Racing
 Mauro Matos from  Deportivo Armenio
 José Manuel Contreras from  Comunicaciones (loan)
 Cristian Campestrini from  Almirante Brown
 Matías Alasia from  Tiro Federal
 Matías Carabajal from  Ferro
Out
 José Luis Calderón to  Estudiantes de La Plata
 Pablo Garnier to  Colón de Santa Fe
 Martín Andrizzi to  Deportivo Quito
 Martín Civit to  LD Alajuelense
 Alexander Corro to  Atlanta (end of loan)
 Leonardo Biagini (released)
 Carlos Ruiz (retired)

Banfield 
In
 Guillermo Esteban from  Belgrano (loan return)
 Gastón Schmidt from  Quilmes (loan return)
 Enrique Bologna from  Alianza Lima (loan return)
 Víctor López from  Real Sociedad
 Marcelo Bustamante &  Maximiliano Bustos from  Vélez Sársfield
 Santiago Raymonda from  CD Veracruz
 Walter Ervitti from  CF Monterrey
 Nicolás Bertolo from  Nacional
 Sebastián Fernández from  Defensor Sporting (loan)
 Federico Nieto from  Huracán
 Cristian Nasuti from  River Plate
 Claudio Ortiz from  Wydad Casablanca
 Francisco Paravano from  Atlético Rafaela
Out
 Darío Cvitanich to  Ajax
 Javier Villarreal to  Cerro Porteño
 Jairo Patiño to  San Luis Potosí
 Nicolás Pavlovich to  Argentinos Juniors
 Daniel Quinteros to  Apollon Limassol
 Pablo Santillo to  Barcelona SC
 Sergio Esteche to  Aldosivi
 Gabriel Longo to  Racing de Trelew
 Mauricio Pedano to  F.C. Matera
 Diego Herner to  Huracán
 Javier Sanguinetti (retired)

Boca Juniors 
In
 José María Calvo from  Recreativo Huelva (loan return)
 Juan Krupoviesa from  Olympique de Marseille (loan return)
 Julio Barroso from  Estudiantes LP (loan return)
 Damián Díaz from  Rosario Central
 Luciano Figueroa from  Genoa C.F.C. (loan)
Out
 Luis Ibáñez to  Dinamo Zagreb
 Pablo Ledesma to  Catania
 Sebastián Nayar to  Recreativo Huelva
 Mauro Boselli to  Estudiantes LP
 Sebastián Alberto Battaglia to  UA Maracaibo (loan)
 Pablo Migliore to  Racing (loan)
 Fabián Monzón to  Real Betis
 Jonathan Maidana to  FC Metalist Kharkiv

Colón de Santa Fe 
In
 Sebastián Sciorilli from  River Plate (loan)
 Pablo Garnier from  Arsenal
 Nicolás Torres from  Tigre
 Diego Pozo from  Instituto
 Salustiano Candia from  Veracruz
 Robert Franco from  2 de Mayo
 Diego Crosa from  Maccabi Haifa F.C.
 Lucas Valdemarín from  AIK
 Matías Oyola from  Independiente (loan)
 Pablo Rodríguez from  El Porvenir
Out
 Rodrigo Díaz &  Juan Ramón Fernández to  Argentinos Juniors
 Darío Gandín to  Independiente
 Hugo Iriarte to  Gimnasia LP
 Alcides Píccoli to  Cerro Porteño
 Pablo Jerez to  Tigre (loan)
 Juan José Morales to  Quilmes
 César González to  Huracán
 Laureano Tombolini to  Instituto
 Hernán Encina to  Godoy Cruz
 Diego Reynoso to  Atlético Tucumán
 Andrés Bailo to  Sportivo Belgrano (loan)
 Claudio Enría (released)

Estudiantes de La Plata 
In
 José Luis Calderón from  Arsenal de Sarandí
 Gastón Fernández from  UANL Tigres (loan)
 Mariano Barbosa from  Recreativo Huelva
 Mauro Boselli from  Boca Juniors
 Matías Sánchez from  Racing
 Maximiliano Núñez from  Temperley (loan return)
Out
 Julio Barroso to  Boca Juniors (end of loan)
 José Basanta to  CF Monterrey
 Pablo Piatti to  UD Almería
 Ezequiel Maggiolo to  C.F. Ciudad Juárez (loan)
 Leonardo Sánchez to  San Martín de San Juan (loan)
 Édgar González to  Olimpia
 Gonzalo Saucedo to  Godoy Cruz (loan)
 Leandro Lázzaro to  Tigre
 Maximiliano Badell to  Platense (loan)
 Ezequiel Brítez to  Deportivo Irapuato
 Pablo Lugüercio to  Racing
 Marcos Pirchio to  Olimpo (loan)
 Lucas Wilchez to  Talleres

Gimnasia y Esgrima La Plata 
In
 Roberto Sosa from  S.S.C. Napoli
 Ariel Agüero from  San Martín de San Juan
 Mariano Messera from  Rosario Central
 Gastón Sessa from  Barcelona SC
 René Lima from  Maccabi Haifa F.C.
 Hugo Iriarte from  Colón de Santa Fe
 Sebastián Romero from  Panathinaikos FC
 Esteban González from  UD Las Palmas
 Rubén Maldonado from  Chievo Verona
 Franco Niell from  D.C. United
 Patricio Graff from  Hércules CF
 Denis Stracqualursi from  Unión de Sunchales
 Martín Ortiz from  San Martín de San Juan
 Sergio Valenti from  Ben Hur
Out
 Renato Civelli to  Olympique de Marseille (end of loan)
 Matías Escobar to  Kayserispor
 Santiago Gentiletti to  Provincial Osorno
 Antonio Piergüidi to  Quilmes (loan)
 Luis Ignacio Quinteros to  Lobos de la BUAP
 Ignacio Oroná to  Villa San Carlos
 Mauricio Yedro to  Defensa y Justicia
 Elvio Friedrich to  Los Andes
 Roberto Salvatierra to  Olimpo
 Sergio Leal to  Danubio F.C.
 Federico Domínguez to  Apollon Limassol

Gimnasia y Esgrima de Jujuy 
In
 Walter Busse from  Atlético Minero (loan return)
 David Ramírez from  Godoy Cruz
 Gastón Pezzuti from  Atlético Rafaela
 Ariel Franco from  San Martín de San Juan
 Sebastián Rocco from  Audax Italiano (loan from Necaxa)
 Ariel Montenegro from  Hércules CF
 Pablo Calandria from  Albacete
 Claudio Fileppi from  Racing
 Mauricio Ferradas from  Deportivo Cuenca
 Juan Lapietra from  Independiente (loan)
Out
 Juan Manuel Herbella to  UA Maracaibo
 Mario Turdó,  Marcelo Quinteros &  Facundo Pérez Castro to  San Martín de Tucumán
 José Valdiviezo to  Atlético Tucumán
 Eric Schmil to  Belgrano
 Mauricio Almada to  Quilmes
 Luis Miguel Escalada to  Newell's Old Boys (end of loan from L.D.U. de Quito)
 Matías Miramontes to  A.C. Ancona
 Gustavo Coronel to  Talleres de Perico
 Nicolás Armella to  Gimnasia y Tiro de Salta
 Miguel Ángel Gutiérrez to  Juventud Antoniana
 Luciano De Bruno and  Gabriel Ruiz (released)

Godoy Cruz 
In
 Marcos Ramírez from  Independiente (loan)
 Jairo Castillo from  Defensor Sporting
 Jonathan Schunke from  Almagro
 Iván Borghello from  Talleres
 Leonardo Sigali from  Lanús
 Gonzalo Saucedo from  Estudiantes LP
 Jorge Carranza from  Instituto
 Víctor Figueroa from  Chacarita Juniors
 Wilmer Crisanto from  CD Victoria (loan)
 Hernán Encina from  Colón
 Víctor Ferreira from  Cerro Porteño
 Lautaro Formica from  San Lorenzo
Out
 Julio Moreyra to  Instituto (end of loan)
 David Ramírez to  Gimnasia de Jujuy
 Gabriel González to  Atlético Tucumán
 Enzo Cappa to  Deportivo Maipú
 Gerardo Solana to  San Martín de Tucumán
 Matías Cuello to  Racing de Córdoba
 Luis Ovelar to  Cerro Porteño PF
 David Fernández to  Tigre
 Jorge Curbelo to  Defensor Sporting

Huracán 
In
 Ariel Cólzera from  Atlético Rafaela
 Carlos Casartelli from  C.F. Ciudad Juárez
 Alejandro Limia from  Cádiz CF
 Gastón Esmerado from  Skoda Xanthi
 Sergio Meza Sánchez from  Almirante Brown
 Carlos Araujo from  Olimpo
 Matías Manrique from  Peñarol
 Germán Castillo from  Deportivo Cuenca
 Lucas Calviño from  Almagro
 Fernando Pagés from  Persiraja Banda Aceh
 Matías Gigli from  Belgrano
 César González from  Colón de Santa Fe
 Hernán Barcos from  Red Star Belgrade (loan from Racing)
 Gastón Beraldi from  Platense
 Diego Herner from  Banfield
 David González from  Çaykur Rizespor
Out
 Cristian Sánchez Prette to  CFR Cluj
 Eduardo Domínguez to  Los Angeles Galaxy
 Damián Nieto to  Almagro
 Marcelo Barovero to  Vélez Sársfield
 Franco Mendoza to  Olimpia
 Ángel Puertas to  Independiente
 Claudio Guerra to  Unión (loan)
 Walter Coyette to  Chacarita Juniors
 Andrés Franzoia to  Rosario Central (end of loan from Boca Juniors)
 Omar Zarif to  Rosario Central
 Federico Nieto to  Banfield
 Yusuke Kato to  Defensores de Belgrano (loan)
 Federico Poggi to  AC Ajaccio
 Germán Lanaro to  Guillermo Brown
 Francisco Maciel &  Antonio Barijho (released)

Independiente 
In
 Leonel Ríos from  Vélez Sársfield
 Emanuel Centurión from  Atlas (loan)
 Federico Higuaín from  América
 Darío Gandín from  Colón
 Ángel Puertas from  Huracán
 Leonel Núñez from  Olympiacos
 Leandro Depetris from  Brescia
 Hilario Navarro from  Racing
Out
 Germán Denis to  S.S.C. Napoli
 Marcos Ramírez to  Godoy Cruz (loan)
 Emiliano Rébora to  Estudiantes BA (loan)
 Hernán Pérez to  Almagro (loan)
 Gastón Machín to  Newell's Old Boys (loan)
 Matías Oyola to  Colón (loan)
 Enzo Bruno to  San Martín de Tucumán (loan)
 Juan Lapietra to  Gimnasia de Jujuy (loan)
 Pablo Vitti to  FC Chornomorets Odessa (loan)
 Sebastián Carrizo to  Olimpo
 Carlos Matheu to  Cagliari

Lanús 
In
 Hernán Grana from  All Boys
 Gustavo Balvorín from  Vélez Sársfield
Out
 Lautaro Acosta to  Sevilla FC
 Nelson Benítez to  FC Porto
 Leonardo Sigali to  Godoy Cruz
 Rodrigo Acosta to  Sevilla Atlético
 Claudio Flores to  Tacuarembó F.C.
 Agustín Pelletieri to  AEK Athens (loan)

Newell's Old Boys 
In
 Germán Caffa from  San Martín de Tucumán
 Juan Manuel Insaurralde from  Chacarita Juniors
 Diego Barreto (loan return),  Ernesto Cristaldo &  Walter Fretes from  Cerro Porteño
 Pablo Monsalvo from  AIK
 Sebastián Grazzini from  Sestrese
 Gastón Machín from  Independiente (loan)
 Cristian Fabbiani from  CFR Cluj
 Sebastián Peratta from  Vélez Sársfield
 Leandro Armani &  Iván Pillud from  Tiro Federal (loan)
 Luis Miguel Escalada from  Gimnasia de Jujuy (loan from L.D.U. de Quito)
 Gustavo Pinto from  Olimpo
 Marcos Flores from  Unión (loan return)
 Emanuel Lazzarini from  Temperley (loan return)
 Marcelo Penta from  Chacarita Juniors (loan return)
Out
 Justo Villar to  Real Valladolid
 Cristian Llama to  Catania (end of loan)
 Martín Seri to  San Martín de San Juan (loan)
 Nicolás Cabrera to  Vélez Sársfield
 Marcos Gutiérrez to  San Martín de Tucumán
 Adrián Lucero to  Racing
 Santiago Salcedo to  River Plate
 Pablo Vázquez to  Nueva Chicago
 Miguel Ángel Torren to  Cerro Porteño (loan)
 Juan Manuel Sosa to  Almirante Brown
 Augusto Mainguyague to  Bolívar

Racing Club 
In
 Martín Wagner &  Leandro González from  Olimpo
 Adrián Lucero from  Newell's Old Boys
 Pablo Lugüercio from  Estudiantes LP
 Franco Peppino from  Veracruz
 Lucas Aveldaño from  Atlético Rafaela
 Pablo Migliore from  Boca Juniors (loan)
Out
 Diego Manicero to  Belgrano (end of loan from Lanús)
 Facundo Sava to  Arsenal
 Bernardo Leyenda to  San Martín de Tucumán
 Claudio Fileppi to  Gimnasia de Jujuy
 Maximiliano Estévez &  Erwin Ávalos to  Cerro Porteño
 Matías Sánchez to  Estudiantes LP
 Reinaldo Navia to  LDU Quito
 Adrián Bastía to  Asteras Tripolis
 Santiago Malano &  Diego Menghi to  Atlético Rafaela
 Hilario Navarro to  Independiente
 Roberto Bonet (released)

River Plate 
In 
 Diego Barrado from  Olimpo (loan return)
 Robert Flores from  River Plate de Montevideo (loan from Villarreal CF)
 Martín Galmarini from  Tigre
 Facundo Quiroga from  VfL Wolfsburg
 Santiago Salcedo from  Newell's Old Boys
 Sebastián Abreu from  Beitar Jerusalem (only for the Copa Sudamericana
Out
 Juan Pablo Carrizo to  S.S. Lazio (end of loan)
 Alexis to  Udinese (end of loan)
 Sebastián Abreu to  Beitar Jerusalem
 Hernán Lillo to  Almagro (loan)
 Maximiliano Oliva to  Tigre (loan)
 Diego Cardozo to  Instituto (loan)
 Nicolás Domingo to  Genoa (loan)
 Lucas Sánchez &  Lucas Malacarne to  FC Dallas (loan)
 Ariel Ortega &  Judelin Aveska to  Independiente Rivadavia (loan)
 Federico Almerares to  FC Basel
 Cristian Nasuti to  Banfield
 Sebastián Sciorilli to  Colón (loan)
 Matías Díaz to  San Martín de San Juan (loan)
 Horacio Ameli (retired)

Rosario Central 
In
 Ezequiel González from  Panathinaikos FC
 Jorge Núñez from  Cerro Porteño
 Andrés Franzoia &  Omar Zarif from  Huracán
 Ignacio Ithurralde from  Olimpo (loan from CF Monterrey)
Out
 Cristian Álvarez to  Espanyol
 Tomás Costa to  FC Porto
 Mariano Messera to  Gimnasia de La Plata
 Emiliano Papa to  Vélez Sársfield (end of loan)
 Martín Arzuaga to  Junior
 Ronald Raldes to  Al-Hilal
 Germán Medina to  Tiro Federal
 Ramiro Fassi to  Quilmes
 Eduardo Farías to  Almagro
 Andrés Imperiale to  San Martín de Tucumán (loan)
 Federico Martínez to  Deportes Antofagasta
 Maximiliano Pérez to  Defensor Sporting Club
 Damián Díaz to  Boca Juniors
 Diego Calgaro to  AS Trencin
 Gabriel Casas to  Real Arroyo Seco
 Gonzalo Belloso (retired)
 Hernán Castellano (released)

San Lorenzo 
In
 Pablo Barrientos from  FC Moscow
 Cristian Ledesma from  Olympiacos F.C. (loan)
 Fabián Bordagaray from  Defensa y Justicia
 Santiago Solari from  Inter

Out
 Daniel Bilos to  AS Saint-Étienne (end of loan)
 Sebastián Saja to  AEK Athens F.C.
 Néstor Villalva,  Osvaldo Centurión &  Matías Vega to  Platense
 Andrés D'Alessandro to  SC Internacional
 Diego Placente to  Bordeaux
 Jonathan Bottinelli to  U. C. Sampdoria
 Lautaro Formica to  Godoy Cruz
 Michael Díaz and  Emiliano Díaz (released)

San Martín de Tucumán 
In
 Matías Villavicencio,  Raúl Saavedra &  Marcelo Perugini from  Olimpo
 Patricio Pérez from  Vélez Sársfield             
 Mario Turdó,  Marcelo Quinteros &  Facundo Pérez Castro from  Gimnasia de Jujuy
 Matías Ceballos from  Central Norte
 Nicolás Herrera from  San Martín de San Juan
 Daniel Vega from  Emelec
 Gerardo Solana from  Godoy Cruz
 Bernardo Leyenda from  Racing
 Pablo De Muner from  Polideportivo Ejido
 Marcos Gutiérrez from  Newell's Old Boys
 Enzo Bruno from  Independiente (loan)
 Andrés Imperiale from  Rosario Central (loan)
 Antonio Ibáñez from  9 de Julio de Morteros
Out
 Mariano Campodónico to  Cerro Porteño
 Esteban Gil &  Fernando Cravero to  Atlético Rafaela
 Germán Caffa to  Newell's Old Boys
 Luciano Krikorián to  All Boys
 Lucas Oviedo to  Tigre
 Andrés Aparicio to  Quilmes
 David Robles to  Sarmiento
 Diego Romano to  Ergotelis F.C.
 Juan Acosta Cabrera to  Los Andes
 Pablo López &  Emanuel Perea to  Santiago Wanderers

Tigre 
In
 Carlos Luna from  Elche CF
 Mauro Villegas from  CAI
 Lucas Oviedo from  San Martín de Tucumán
 Maximiliano Oliva from  River Plate (loan)
 Leandro Lázzaro from  Estudiantes LP
 Cristian Bardaro from  Danubio F.C.
 Pablo Jerez from  Colón (loan)
 Rodolfo Arruabarrena from  AEK Athens
 Alberto Alarcón from  Defensores de Belgrano
 David Fernández from  Godoy Cruz
 Sebastián Rosano from  Cagliari
Out
 Guillermo Suárez to  Dinamo Zagreb
 Sebastián Ereros to  Asteras Tripolis (end of loan from Vélez Sársfield)
 Nicolás Torres to  Colón
 Román Martínez to  RCD Espanyol (end of loan from Arsenal de Sarandí)
 Lucas Pratto to  FC Lyn Oslo (end of loan from Boca Juniors)
 Facundo Diz to  Olimpo
 Gastón Stang to  Talleres
 Lucas Alessandria to  Unión
 Martín Galmarini to  River Plate
 Sebastián Pistelli to  Deportivo Merlo
 Santiago Morero to  Chievo Verona
 Miguel Angel Cuellar (released)

Vélez Sársfield 
In
 Emiliano Papa from  Rosario Central (loan return)
 Juan Manuel Martínez from  Al-Shabab (loan return)
 Marco Torsiglieri from  Talleres de Córdoba (loan return)
 Leandro Somoza from  Real Betis
 Hernán Rodrigo López from  América
 Fabián Cubero from  UANL Tigres
 Marcelo Barovero from  Huracán
 Nicolás Cabrera from  Newell's Old Boys
 Roberto Nanni from  FC Dynamo Kyiv
 Emmanuel Fernandes Francou from  Olimpia (loan return)
Out
 Leonel Ríos to  Independiente
 Damián Escudero to  Real Valladolid
 Patricio Pérez to  San Martín de Tucumán
 Marcelo Bustamante &  Maximiliano Bustos to  Banfield
 Facundo Coria &  Sergio Sena to  Arsenal (loan)
 Hernán Pellerano to  UD Almería
 Gustavo Balvorín to  Lanús
 Damián Casalinuovo to  Platense
 Juan Sills to  LD Alajuelense (loan)
 Sebastián Peratta to  Newell's Old Boys
 Luciano Vella to  FC Rapid București (end of loan from Cádiz CF)
 Maximiliano Timpanaro to  Chacarita Juniors (loan)
 Roberto Floris to  Everton de Viña del Mar

January 2009 (summer) transfer window 
See List of Argentine Primera División transfers January 2009

References

2008-09
Football transfers summer 2008
Transfers